Mirmadan Mohanlal Government Polytechnic , is a government polytechnic located in Plassey,  Nadia district, West Bengal.

About college
This polytechnic is affiliated to the West Bengal State Council of Technical Education,  and recognised by AICTE, New Delhi. This polytechnic offers diploma courses in Food Processing Technology and Electrical & Electronics Engineering.

See also

References

External links
Official website WBSCTE

Universities and colleges in Nadia district
Technical universities and colleges in West Bengal
2014 establishments in West Bengal
Educational institutions established in 2014